"In the Name of Love" is a 1982 single written and performed by British pop band Thompson Twins, at the time a septet (Tom Bailey, Alannah Currie, Joe Leeway, John Roog, Chris Bell, Peter Dodd, and Matthew Seligman). It was the first of twelve entries on the Billboard dance chart for the group.

Record World called it a "driving electronic rocker" with "frantic guitars, keyboards and percussion."

"In the Name of Love" went to number one on the dance music chart and stayed there for five weeks, and spent a total of twenty-one weeks on the chart. It peaked at number sixty-nine on the Billboard R&B chart.

The track was newly remixed in 1988 by Shep Pettibone and included as "In the Name of Love '88" on the Greatest Mixes compilation album. The single peaked at #46 in the UK, spending 3 weeks on the chart. The single fared better in America, where it peaked at #1 on the US Billboard Dance/Club Play chart.

Formats
7" Single (1982)
"In the Name of Love"
"In the Beginning"

12" Single (1982)
"In the Name of Love" (12" Dance Extension)
"In the Beginning"
"Coastline"

7" Single
"In the Name of Love '88" – 3:30
"In the Name of Love" (Original) – 3:18

12" Single
"In the Name of Love '88" (Railroad Mix) – 6:40
"In the Name of Love '88" (Railroad Dub) – 5:48
"In the Name of Love" (Original) – 3:18

12" Single (US)
"In the Name of Love '88" (Railroad Mix) – 6:40
"In the Name of Love '88" (Railroad Dub) – 5:48
"In the Name of Love '88" (Single Mix) – 3:30
"In the Name of Love '88" (Extended Mix) – 5:18
"In the Name of Love '88" (Dub) – 6:20
"Passion Planet" – 3:42

CD Single
"In the Name of Love '88" (Single Mix) – 3:30
"In the Name of Love '88" (Railroad Mix) – 6:40
"In the Name of Love '88" (Railroad Dub) – 5:48
"In the Name of Love '88" (Original) – 3:18

Personnel
 Producer – Steve Lillywhite
 Additional production by Shep Pettibone for Mastermix Productions
 Mixed by Shep Pettibone and Steve Peck
 Digitally edited by Tuta Aquino

Chart performance

See also
 List of number-one dance singles of 1982 (U.S.)
 List of number-one dance singles of 1988 (U.S.)

References

External links
 

1982 singles
Thompson Twins songs
British dance-pop songs
Songs written by Tom Bailey (musician)
Songs written by Alannah Currie
1988 singles
1982 songs
Song recordings produced by Steve Lillywhite